In 1803, in response to the restitution of the Moluccas to the Dutch as per the Treaty of Amiens of 1802, Lord Wellesley, Governor-General of India, decided upon the resettlement of Balambangan Island, and instructed R. J. Farquhar, the British Resident at Amboina for the British East India Company (EIC), to manage the expedition.

Farquhar reestablished the settlement at Balambangan by the end of September 1803. The resumption of war with France led the EIC to abandon the island in 1805.

, under the command of Captain W.J.Hamilton, a 22-gun sloop belonging to the Bombay Marine, the EIC's naval arm, was the sole warship of the expedition.

Source
Naval Chronicle, Vol.12. p.441.

Age of Sail merchant ships of England
Lists of sailing ships
Lists of ships of the United Kingdom